Kenneth Michael Smith (born June 1, 1948)
is an American politician. He served as a Democratic member for the 31st district of the Louisiana State Senate.

Smith was born in Winnfield, Louisiana, the son of P. K. Smith. Smith graduated from high school in Winnfield in 1966, then attended Northwestern State University, where he earned a degree in agribusiness in 1970. Smith is related to the Long family of Louisiana politicians.

In 1996 Smith was elected for the 31st district of the Louisiana State Senate. After serving the maximum term of 12 years, Smith was succeeded by his cousin Gerald Long in 2008.

References 

1948 births
Living people
People from Winnfield, Louisiana
Louisiana state senators
Louisiana Republicans
Louisiana Independents
20th-century American politicians
21st-century American politicians
Northwestern State University alumni
Long family
American automobile salespeople